The Richard and Rhoda Goldman School of Public Policy, or the Goldman School of Public Policy (GSPP), is a public policy school and one of fourteen schools and colleges at the University of California, Berkeley. Originally named the Graduate School of Public Policy, it was founded in 1969 as one of the first public policy institutions in the United States. In 2016, the Goldman School was ranked as the #1 public policy graduate program in the country by U.S. News & World Report.

History
The Graduate School was renamed after the Richard and Rhoda Goldman Fund donated $10 million in 1997. As of August 2016, the dean is Henry E. Brady. The first dean was political scientist Aaron Wildavsky.

The building was originally designed by Ernest Coxhead in 1893 as the Beta Theta Pi fraternity house.  It is located on the historic north side of the Berkeley campus.  The building underwent seismic strengthening and received a Preservation Award from the Berkeley Architectural Heritage Association (BAHA).

The main component of the school's graduate curriculum is the two-year Master of Public Policy (MPP) program. The curriculum includes core courses that provide a foundation in subjects ranging from political elements of the decision-making process and legal analysis to such specific analytic tools and concepts as microeconomic theory and statistical modeling. The curriculum also includes five electives, taken either at GSPP or elsewhere at Berkeley.

Students work at a summer policy internship between their first and second years and complete an analysis, in groups and individually, during the spring semester of each year. Locally- and nationally-known policy professionals, provide perspective and guidance to students.

GSPP offers a Master of Public Policy degree, a Master of Public Affairs degree for mid-career professionals,and Master of Development Practice (MDP) degree and a Ph.D. in Public Policy for those interested in furthering research in public policy methods. Though it does not award bachelor's degrees, it offers a minor program for undergraduates.

Notable faculty

See also
 Goldman Environmental Prize
 Cloyne Court Hotel

References

External links

University of California, Berkeley
Public policy schools
1969 establishments in California
Educational institutions established in 1969